Sophie Cocks (born 25 July 1994) is a New Zealand field hockey player, and a member of the women's national team, the Black Sticks.

Born in Christchurch, Cocks grew up in Lincoln, a satellite town southwest of the city. She attended St Margaret's College in Christchurch.

Cocks played her first senior international test on 30 October 2013 in Stratford, Taranaki, New Zealand against Australia as part of the 2013 Oceania Cup. She scored the winning goal in the 3–2 match, with a field goal in the 60th minute.

References

External links
 

1994 births
Living people
New Zealand female field hockey players
Olympic field hockey players of New Zealand
Commonwealth Games bronze medallists for New Zealand
Commonwealth Games medallists in field hockey
Field hockey players at the 2014 Commonwealth Games
Field hockey players at the 2016 Summer Olympics
People from Lincoln, New Zealand
Sportspeople from Canterbury, New Zealand
20th-century New Zealand women
21st-century New Zealand women
Medallists at the 2014 Commonwealth Games